Luther Price (pseudonym) (January 26, 1962 – June 13, 2020) was an experimental filmmaker and visual artist.

Biography
Price was born in Marlborough, Massachusetts in 1962. He received a BFA in Sculpture and Media/Performing Arts from Massachusetts College of Art and Design, where he studied with Saul Levine. Before taking the name Luther Price, he worked under various pseudonyms, including Brigk Aethy, Fag, and Tom Rhoads. While at Massachusetts College of Art and Design, Luther collaborated with students in the Studio for Interrelated Media on many projects including creating events, performance art, music projects and exhibitions. He was an experimental filmmaker whose work has been widely screened in the United States and Europe at such venues as the Museum of Modern Art, the Whitney Museum of American Art, and the San Francisco Cinematheque. He was an adjunct professor at the Massachusetts College of Art and Design and the School of the Museum of Fine Arts at Tufts teaching his popular "Hand-made Films" curriculum.

Price's Super 8mm and 16mm films are usually constructed from found footage and often include controversial subject matter, such as pornography, surgical footage, and psychodramatic performances, as well as physical interventions into the actual material of the film stock. Later in his career he began crafting individual 35mm slides shown on slide projectors. His work was featured prominently in the 2012 Whitney Biennial. Roberta Smith of the New York Times called him "one of the Biennial's stars." Ed Halter selected his Inkblot films as the Best Film of 2011, noting "[his films] struggle through the projector with an unsettlingly existential corporeality." His films are distributed by Canyon Cinema in San Francisco, The Film-Makers' Cooperative in New York, and Light Cone in Paris. He was represented by Callicoon Fine Arts. He died at his home in Revere, Massachusetts on June 13, 2020, at the age of 58.

Selected works

Green (1988) (as Tom Rhoads) Super 8 mm, color, sound, 36 minutes
Warm Broth (1988) (as Tom Rhoads) Super 8mm, color, sound, 30 minutes
Sodom (1989) Super 8 mm, color, sound, 21 minutes
Clown (1991) Super 8 mm, color, sound, 13 minutes
Meat (1992) Super 8 mm on video, color, sound, 60 minutes, also a 2-hour performance
Bottle Can (1993) Super 8 mm, color, sound, 20 minutes
Eruption Erection (1994) Super 8 mm, color, sound, 10 minutes,
Jellyfish Sandwich (1994) Super 8 mm, color, sound, 17 minutes
Run (1994) Super 8 mm, color, sound, 13 minutes
A. (1994) Super 8 mm, b&w, sound, 60 minutes
Me Gut No Dog Dog (1994) Super 8 mm, color, sound, 42 minutes
Meat Situation 04 (1997) Super 8 mm, color, sound, 4 minutes
Mother (1998–1999) Super 8 mm, color, sound, 25 minutes
Home (1990–1999) Super 8 mm, b&w, sound, 13 minutes
Ritual 629 (1990–1999) Super 8 mm, color, sound, 15 minutes
Recitations (1999) Super 8 mm, color, sound, 10 minutes

Yellow Goodbye (1999) Super 8 mm, color, sound, 10 minutes
Meat Blue 03 (1999) Super 8 mm, color, sound
Res hat ions (2000) Super 8mm, b&w, sound, 10 minutes
#5, (2000) Super 8mm, color, sound
I'll Cry Tomorrow, Parts 1 and 2 (2000) Super 8mm, color, sound, 20 minutes
Dead Ringer (2000) Super 8mm, color, sound, 3 minutes
A Patch of Green (2004) 16mm, 4 minutes
Nice Biscotts #2 (2005) 16mm, 10 minutes
September Song (2005) 16mm, 5 minutes
Dipping Sause (2005) 16mm, 8 minutes
Turbulant Blue (2005-6) 16mm, 9 minutes
Inside Velvet K (2006) 16mm, 10 minutes
Fancy (2006) 16mm, 12 minutes
Tamponia (2007) 16mm, 8 minutes
Suffering Biscuits (2007) 16mm, 20 minutes
Shelly Winters (2010) 16mm, 11 minutes
After the Garden: Silking (2010) 16mm, 6 minutes

Notes

References

Bibliography

External links
 San Francisco Cinematheque program notes from the Prelinger Archives
 Canyon Cinema
 Light Cone
 Film-makers Cooperative
 California College of the Arts Lecture, 2012
 2012 Whitney Biennial short: Luther Price
 Rain n Shines Labyrinth Demo on SoundCloud
 Eulogy from Mostra Internacional de Cinema Periférico organization
 Luther Price: Light Window screening at MassArt, 2015
 Luther Price MassArt Alumni Award, 2015
 Luther Price, from Here to Eternity, 2020

1962 births
2020 deaths
20th-century American artists
21st-century American artists
American experimental filmmakers
Film directors from Massachusetts
People from Marlborough, Massachusetts
People from Revere, Massachusetts
Massachusetts College of Art and Design alumni
Pseudonymous artists